List of Guggenheim Fellowships awarded in 2022:

References 

2022
2022 awards